Typhochlaena seladonia is a species of aviculariine tarantula, and is the type species of the genus Typhochlaena. It is unique as an arboreal spider that constructs trapdoors in the bark of trees.

The common name is the Brazilian jewel tarantula.

Taxonomy
T. seladonia was originally described by Carl Ludwig Koch, in Brazil in 1841, as Mygale seladonia. In 1850 he changed its name to Typhochlaena seladonia; then Eugène Simon changed it again to Avicularia seladonia. In 1928, Candido Mello-Leitão changed the species name back to Typhochlaena seladonia, but Andrew Smith (in 1993) changed it to Iridopelma seladonia, and then Lina Almeida-Silva changed it to Iridopelma seladonium. Rogèrio Bertani finally changed the name back to Typhochlaena seladonia in 2012.

Characteristics
The female Typhochlaena seladonia has long, thin spermathecae, which are spiralled distally. The male has a very long embolus. Additionally, both genders have a greenish cephalothorax and a black dorsum with two row of six spots, the posterior pair being reddish and all others being yellowish.

References

Theraphosidae
Spiders of Brazil
Spiders described in 1841